The 1956 Segunda División Peruana, the second division of Peruvian football (soccer), was played by 10 teams. The tournament winner, Porvenir Miraflores was promoted to the Primera División Peruana 1957.

Results

Standings

External links
 La Historia de la Segunda 1956

 

Peruvian Segunda División seasons
Peru2
2